José Carlos Rates (19 February 1879 – 21 January 1961) was the first General Secretary of the Portuguese Communist Party, after the Party's foundation in 1921. Rates was chosen, in 1923, to lead the Party by the delegate of the Communist International in Portugal, Jules Humbert-Droz, after several problems inside the newly founded Party. He was replaced by Bento Gonçalves, in 1929, and later left the party. He joined the National Union in 1931.

References

External links
Adesão à União Nacional de José Carlos Rates

Portuguese Communist Party politicians
National Union (Portugal) politicians
Former Marxists
1879 births
1961 deaths